Indoor tanning involves using a device that emits ultraviolet radiation to produce a cosmetic tan. Typically found in tanning salons, gyms, spas, hotels, and sporting facilities, and less often in private residences, the most common device is a horizontal tanning bed, also known as a sunbed or solarium. Vertical devices are known as tanning booths or stand-up sunbeds.

First introduced in the 1960s, indoor tanning became popular with people in the Western world, particularly in Scandinavia, in the late 1970s. The practice finds a cultural parallel in skin whitening in Asian countries, and both support multibillion-dollar industries. Most indoor tanners are women, 16–25 years old, who want to improve their appearance or mood, acquire a pre-holiday tan, or treat a skin condition.

Across Australia, Canada, Northern Europe and the United States, 18.2% of adults, 45.2% of university students, and 22% of adolescents had tanned indoors in the previous year, according to studies in 2007–2012. As of 2010 the indoor-tanning industry employed 160,000 in the United States, where 10–30 million tanners visit 25,000 indoor facilities annually. In the United Kingdom, 5,350 tanning salons were in operation in 2009. From 1997 several countries and US states banned under-18s from indoor tanning. The commercial use of tanning beds was banned entirely in Brazil in 2009 and Australia in 2015. , thirteen U.S. states and one territory have banned under-18s from using them, and at least 42 states and the District of Columbia have imposed regulations, such as requiring parental consent.

Indoor tanning is a source of UV radiation, which is known to cause skin cancer, including melanoma and skin aging, and is associated with sunburn, photodrug reactions, infections, weakening of the immune system, and damage to the eyes, including cataracts, photokeratitis (snow blindness) and eye cancer. Injuries caused by tanning devices lead to over 3,000 emergency-room cases a year in the United States alone. Physicians may use or recommend tanning devices to treat skin conditions such as psoriasis, but the World Health Organization does not recommend their use for cosmetic purposes. The WHO's International Agency for Research on Cancer includes tanning devices, along with ultraviolet radiation from the sun, in its list of group 1 carcinogens. Researchers at the Yale School of Public Health found evidence of addiction to tanning in a 2017 paper.

Background

Ultraviolet radiation

Ultraviolet radiation (UVR) is part of the electromagnetic spectrum, just beyond visible light. Ultraviolet wavelengths are 100 to 400 nanometres (nm, billionths of a metre) and are divided into three bands: A, B and C. UVA wavelengths are the longest, 315 to 400 nm; UVB are 280 to 315 nm, and UVC wavelengths are the shortest, 100 to 280 nm.

About 95% of the UVR that reaches the earth from the sun is UVA and 5% UVB; no appreciable UVC reaches the earth. While tanning systems before the 1970s produced some UVC, modern tanning devices produce no UVC, a small amount of UVB and mostly UVA. Classified by the WHO as a group 1 carcinogen, UVR has "complex and mixed effects on human health". While it causes skin cancer and other damage, including wrinkles, it also triggers the synthesis of vitamin D and endorphins in the skin.

History

In 1890 the Danish physician Niels Ryberg Finsen developed a carbon arc lamp ("Finsen's light" or a "Finsen lamp") that produced ultraviolet radiation for use in skin therapy, including to treat lupus vulgaris. He won the 1903 Nobel Prize in Physiology or Medicine for his work.

Until the late 19th century in Europe and the United States, pale skin was a symbol of high social class among white people. Victorian women would carry parasols and wear wide-brimmed hats and gloves; their homes featured heavy curtains that kept out the sun. But as the working classes moved from country work to city factories, and to crowded, dark, unsanitary homes, pale skin became increasingly associated with poverty and ill health. In 1923 Coco Chanel returned from a holiday in Cannes with a tan, later telling Vogue magazine: "A golden tan is the index of chic!" Tanned skin had become a fashion accessory.

In parallel physicians began advising their patients on the benefits of the "sun cure", citing its antiseptic properties. Sunshine was promoted as a treatment for depression, diabetes, constipation, pneumonia, high and low blood pressure, and many other ailments. Home-tanning equipment was introduced in the 1920s in the form of "sunlamps" or "health lamps", UV lamps that emitted a large percentage of UVB, leading to burns. Friedrich Wolff, a German scientist, began using UV light on athletes, and developed beds that emitted 95% UVA and 5% UVB, which reduced the likelihood of burning. The world's first tanning salon opened in 1977 in Berlin, followed by tanning salons in Europe and North America in the late 1970s. In 1978 Wolff's devices began selling in the United States, and the indoor tanning industry was born.

Devices

Lamps

Tanning lamps, also known as tanning bulbs or tanning tubes, produce the ultraviolet light in tanning devices. The performance (or output) varies widely between brands and styles. Most are low-pressure fluorescent tubes, but high-pressure bulbs also exist. The electronics systems and number of lamps affect performance, but to a lesser degree than the lamp itself. Tanning lamps are regulated separately from tanning beds in most countries, as they are the consumable portion of the system.

Beds

Most tanning beds are horizontal enclosures with a bench and canopy (lid) that house long, low-pressure fluorescent bulbs (100–200 watt) under an acrylic surface. The tanner is surrounded by bulbs when the canopy is closed. Modern tanning beds emit mostly UVA (the sun emits around 95% UVA and 5% UVB). One review of studies found that the UVB irradiance of beds was on average lower than the summer sun at latitudes 37°S to 35°N, but that UVA irradiance was on average much higher.

The user sets a timer (or it is set remotely by the salon operator), lies on the bed and pulls down the canopy. The maximum exposure time for most low-pressure beds is 15–20 minutes. Maximum times are set by the manufacturer according to how long it takes to produce four "minimal erythema doses" (MEDs), an upper limit laid down by the FDA. An MED is the amount of UV radiation that will produce erythema (redness of the skin) within a few hours of exposure.

High-pressure beds use smaller, higher-wattage quartz bulbs and emit a higher percentage of UVA. They may emit 10–15 times more UVA than the midday sun, and have a shorter maximum exposure time (typically 10–12 minutes). UVA gives an immediate, short-term tan by bronzing melanin in the skin, but no new melanin is formed. UVB has no immediate bronzing effect, but with a delay of 72 hours makes the skin produce new melanin, leading to tans of longer duration. UVA is less likely to cause burning or dry skin than UVB, but is associated with wrinkling and loss of elasticity because it penetrates deeper.

Commercial tanning beds cost $6,000 to $30,000 as of 2006, with high-pressure beds at the high end. One Manhattan chain was charging $10 to $35 per session in 2016, depending on the number, strength, and type of bulbs. This is known as level 1–6 tanning; level 1 involves a basic low-pressure bed with 36 x 100-watt bulbs. Depending on the quality of the bed, it may contain a separate facial tanner, shoulder tanners, a choice of tanning levels and UVA/UVB combinations, sound system, MP3 connection, aromatherapy, air conditioning, a misting option and voice guide. There are also open-air beds, in which the tanner is not entirely enclosed.

Booths
Tanning booths (also known as stand-up sunbeds) are vertical enclosures; the tanner stands during exposure, hanging onto straps or handrails, and is surrounded by tanning bulbs. In most models, the tanner closes a door, but there are open designs too. Some booths use the same electronics and lamps as tanning beds, but most have more lamps and are likely to use 100–160 watt lamps. They often have a maximum session of 7–15 minutes. There are other technical differences, or degrees of intensity, but for all practical intents, their function and safety are the same as a horizontal bed. Booths have a smaller footprint, which some commercial operators find useful. Some tanners prefer booths out of concern for hygiene, since the only shared surface is the floor.

Lotions and goggles

Before entering a tanning unit, the tanner usually applies indoor tanning lotion to the whole body and may use a separate facial-tanning lotion. These lotions are considerably more expensive than drugstore lotions. They contain no sunscreen, but instead moisturize the skin with ingredients such as aloe vera, hempseed oil and sunflower seed oil. They may also contain dihydroxyacetone, a sunless tanner. So-called "tingle" tanning lotions cause vasodilation, increasing blood circulation.

Goggles (eye protection) should be worn to avoid eye damage. In one 2004 study, tanners said they avoided goggles to prevent leaving pale skin around the eyes. In the US, CFR Title 21 requires that new tanning equipment come with eye protection and most states require that commercial tanning operators provide eye protection for their clients. Laws in other countries are similar.

Prevalence

Tanning-device use

Indoor tanning is most popular with white females, 16–25 years old, with low-to-moderate skin sensitivity, who know other tanners. Studies seeking to link indoor tanning to education level and income have returned inconsistent results. Prevalence was highest in one German study among those with a moderate level of education (neither high nor low).

The late teens to early–mid 20s is the highest-prevalence age group. In a national survey of white teenagers in 2003 in the US (aged 13–19), 24% had used a tanning facility. Indoor-tanning prevalence figures in the US vary from 30 million each year to just under 10 million (7.8 million women and 1.9 million men).

The figures in the US are in decline: according to the Centres for Disease Control and Prevention, usage in the 18–29 age group fell from 11.3 percent in 2010 to 8.6 percent in 2013, perhaps attributable in part to a 10% "tanning tax" introduced in 2010. Attitudes toward tanning vary across states; in one study, doctors in the northeast and midwest of the country were more likely than those in the south or west to recommend tanning beds to treat vitamin D deficiency and depression.

Tanning bed use is more prevalent in northern countries. In Sweden in 2001, 44% said they had used one (in a survey of 1,752 men and women aged 18–37). Their use increased in Denmark between 1994 and 2002 from 35% to 50% (reported use in the previous two years). In Germany, between 29% and 47% had used one, and one survey found that 21% had done so in the previous year. In France, 15% of adults in 1994–1995 had tanned indoors; the practice was more common in the north of France. In 2006, 12% of grade 9–10 students in Canada had used a tanning bed in the last year. In 2004, 7% of 8–11-year-olds in Scotland said they had used one. Tanning bed use is higher in the UK in the north of England. One study found that the prevalence was lower in London than in less urban areas of the country.

Density of facilities
Tanning facilities are ubiquitous in the US, although the figures are in decline. In a study in the US published in 2002, there was a higher density in colder areas with a lower median income and higher proportion of whites. A study in 1997 found an average of 50.3 indoor-tanning facilities in 20 US cities (13.89 facilities for every 100,000 residents); the highest was 134 in Minneapolis, MN, and the lowest four in Honolulu, Hawaii. In 2006 a study of 116 cities in the US found 41.8 facilities on average, a higher density than either Starbucks or McDonald's. Of the country's 125 top colleges and universities in 2014, 12% had indoor-tanning facilities on campus and 42.4% in off-campus housing, 96% of the latter free of charge to the tenants.

There are fewer professional salons than tanning facilities; the latter includes tanning beds in gyms, spas and similar. According to the FDA, citing the Indoor Tanning Association, there were 25,000 tanning salons in 2010 in the US (population 308.7 million in 2010). Mailing-list data suggest there were 18,200 in September 2008 and 12,200 in September 2015, a decline of 30 percent. According to Chris Sternberg of the American Suntanning Association, the figures are 18,000 in 2009 and 9,500 in 2016.

The South West Public Health Observatory found 5,350 tanning salons in the UK in 2009: 4,492 in England (population 52.6 million in 2010), 484 in Scotland (5.3 million), 203 in Wales (3 million) and 171 in Northern Ireland (1.8 million).

Reasons

Overview

Reasons cited for indoor tanning include improving appearance, acquiring a pre-holiday tan, feeling good and treating a skin condition. Tanners often cite feelings of well-being; exposure to tanning beds is reported to "increase serum beta-endorphin levels by 44%". Beta-endorphin is associated with feelings of relaxation and euphoria, including "runner's high".

Improving appearance is the most-cited reason. Studies show that tanned skin has semiotic power, signifying health, beauty, youth and the ability to seduce. Women, in particular, say not only that they prefer their appearance with tanned skin, but that they receive the same message from friends and family, especially from other women. They believe tanned skin makes them look thinner and more toned, and that it covers or heals skin blemishes such as acne. Other reasons include acquiring a base tan for further sunbathing; that a uniform tan is easier to achieve in a tanning unit than in the sun, and a desire to avoid tan lines. Proponents of indoor tanning say that tanning beds deliver more consistent, predictable exposure than the sun, but studies show that indoor tanners do suffer burns. In two surveys in the US in 1998 and 2004, 58% of indoor tanners said they had been burned during sessions.

Vitamin D

Vitamin D is produced when the skin is exposed to UVB, whether from sunlight or an artificial source. It is needed for mineralization of bone and bone growth. Areas in which vitamin D's role is being investigated include reducing the risk of cancer, heart disease, multiple sclerosis and glucose dysregulation. Exposing arms and legs to a minimal 0.5 erythemal (mild sunburn) UVB dose is equal to consuming about 3000 IU of vitamin D3. In a study in Boston, MA, researchers found that adults who used tanning beds had "robust" levels of 25(OH)D (46 ng/mL on average), along with higher hip bone density, compared to adults who did not use them.

Obtaining vitamin D from indoor tanning has to be weighed against the risk of developing skin cancer. The indoor-tanning industry has stressed the relationship between tanning and the production of vitamin D. According to the US National Institutes of Health, some researchers have suggested that "5–30 minutes of sun exposure between 10 AM and 3 PM at least twice a week to the face, arms, legs, or back without sunscreen usually lead to sufficient vitamin D synthesis and that the moderate use of commercial tanning beds that emit 2%–6% UVB radiation is also effective". Most researchers say the health risks outweigh the benefits, that the UVB doses produced by tanning beds exceed what is needed for adequate vitamin D production, and that adequate vitamin D levels can be achieved by taking supplements and eating fortified foods.

Medical use

Certain skin conditions, including keratosis, psoriasis, eczema and acne, may be treated with UVB light therapy, including by using tanning beds in commercial salons. Using tanning beds allows patients to access UV exposure when dermatologist-provided phototherapy is not available. A systematic review of studies, published in Dermatology and Therapy in 2015, noted that moderate sunlight is a treatment recommended by the American National Psoriasis Foundation, and suggested that clinicians consider UV phototherapy and tanning beds as a source of that therapy.

When UV light therapy is used in combination with psoralen, an oral or topical medication, the combined therapy is referred to as PUVA. A concern with the use of commercial tanning is that beds that primarily emit UVA may not treat psoriasis effectively. One study found that plaque psoriasis is responsive to erythemogenic doses of either UVA or UVB. It does require more energy to reach erythemogenic dosing with UVA.

Risks

Skin cancer

Exposure to ultraviolet radiation (UVR), whether from the sun or tanning devices is known to be a major cause of the three main types of skin cancer: non-melanoma skin cancer (basal cell carcinoma and squamous cell carcinoma) and melanoma. Overexposure to UVR induces at least two types of DNA damage: cyclobutane–pyrimidine dimers (CPDs) and 6–4 photoproducts (6–4PPs). While DNA repair enzymes can fix some mutations, if they are not sufficiently effective, a cell will acquire genetic mutations which may cause the cell to die or become cancerous. These mutations can result in cancer, aging, persistent mutation and cell death. For example, squamous cell carcinoma can be caused by a UVB-induced mutation in the p53 gene.

Non-melanoma skin cancer includes squamous cell carcinoma (SCC) and basal cell carcinoma (BCC), and is more common than melanoma. With early detection and treatment, it is typically not life-threatening. Prevalence increases with age, cumulative exposure to UV, and proximity to the equator. It is most prevalent in Australia, where the rate is 1,000 in 100,000 and where, as of 2000, it represented 75 percent of all cancers.

Melanoma accounts for approximately one percent of skin cancer, and causes most of skin cancer-related deaths. The average age of diagnosis is 63, and it is the most common cancer in the 25–29 age group and the second most common in the 15-29 group, which may be due in part to the increased UV exposure and use of indoor tanning observed in this population. In the United States, the melanoma incidence rate was 22.3 per 100,000, based on 2010-2014 data from the National Institutes of Health Surveillance, Epidemiology and End Results (SEER) Program, and the death rate was 2.7 per 100,000. 9,730 people were estimated to die of melanoma in the United States in 2017, and these numbers are anticipated to continue rising. Although 91.7% of patients diagnosed with melanoma survive beyond 5-years, advanced melanoma is largely incurable, and only 19.9% percent of patients with metastatic disease survive beyond 5 years. An international meta-analysis performed in 2014 estimates that annually, 464,170 cases of skin cancer can be attributed to exposure to indoor tanning.

A 2012 analysis of epidemiological studies found a 20% increase in the risk of melanoma (a relative risk of 1.20) among those who had ever used a tanning device compared to those who had not, and a 59% percent increase (a relative risk of 1.59) among those who had used one before age 35. Additionally, a 2014 systematic review and meta-analysis found that indoor tanners had a 16 percent increased risk of developing melanoma, which increased to 23 percent for North Americans. For those who started tanning indoors before age 25, their risk further increased to 35% compared to those who began after age 25.

Other risks
Exposure to UV radiation is associated with skin aging, wrinkle production, liver spots, loss of skin elasticity, erythema (reddening of the skin), sunburn, photokeratitis (snow blindness), ocular melanoma (eye cancer), and infections. Tanning beds can contain many microbes, some of which are pathogens that can cause skin infections and gastric distress. In one study in New York in 2009, the most common pathogens found on tanning beds were Pseudomonas spp. (aeruginosa and putida), Bacillus spp., Klebsiella pneumoniae, Enterococcus species, Staphylococcus aureus, and Enterobacter cloacae. Several prescription and over-the-counter drugs, including antidepressants, antibiotics, antifungals and anti-diabetic medication, can cause photosensitivity, which makes burning the skin while tanning more likely. This risk is increased by a lack of staff training in tanning facilities.

Young people

Children and adolescents who use tanning beds are at greater risk because of biological vulnerability to UV radiation. Epidemiological studies have shown that exposure to artificial tanning increases the risk of malignant melanoma and that the longer the exposure, the greater the risk, particularly in individuals exposed before the age of 30 or who have been sunburned.

One study conducted among college students found that awareness of the risks of tanning beds did not deter the students from using them. Teenagers are frequent targets of tanning industry marketing, which includes offers of coupons and placing ads in high-school newspapers. Members of the United States House Committee on Energy and Commerce commissioned a "sting" operation in 2012, in which callers posing as a 16-year-old woman who wanted to tan for the first time called 300 tanning salons in the US. Staff reportedly failed to follow FDA recommendations, denied the risks of tanning, and offered misleading information about benefits.

Addiction

Addiction to indoor tanning has been recognized as a psychiatric disorder. The disorder is characterized as excessive indoor tanning that causes the subject personal distress; it has been associated with anxiety, eating disorders and smoking. The media has described the addiction as tanorexia. According to the Canadian Pediatric Society, "repeated UVR exposures, and the use of indoor tanning beds specifically, may have important systemic and behavioural consequences, including mood changes, compulsive disorders, pain and physical dependency."

Regulation

Australia
Commercial tanning services are banned in all states, except the Northern Territory where no salons are in operation. Private ownership of tanning beds is permitted.

Brazil
Brazil's National Health Surveillance Agency banned the use of tanning beds for cosmetic purposes in 2009, making that country the first to enact a ban. It followed a 2002 ban on minors using the beds.

Canada
Indoor tanning is prohibited for under-18s in British Columbia, Alberta, Manitoba, Saskatchewan, Ontario, Quebec, and Prince Edward Island; and for under-19s in New Brunswick, Nova Scotia, Newfoundland and Labrador, and the Northwest Territories. Health Canada recommends against the use of tanning equipment.

European Union
In 1997 France became the first country to ban minors from indoor tanning. Under-18s are similarly prohibited in Austria, Belgium, Germany, Ireland, Portugal, Spain, Poland and the United Kingdom. In addition, Ireland prohibits salons from offering "happy hour" discounts.

New Zealand
In New Zealand, indoor tanning is regulated by a voluntary code of practice. Salons are asked to turn away under-18s, those with type 1 skin (fair skin that burns easily or never tans), people who experienced episodes of sunburn as children, and anyone taking certain medications, with several moles, or who has had skin cancer. Tanners are asked to sign a consent form, which includes health information and advice about the importance of wearing goggles. Surveys have found a high level of non-compliance. The government has carried out bi-annual surveys of tanning facilities since 2012.

United States

The Food and Drug Administration (FDA) classifies tanning beds as "moderate risk" devices (changed in 2014 from "low risk"). It requires that devices carry a black box warning that they should not be used by individuals under the age of 18, but it has not banned their use by minors. , the California, Delaware, the District of Columbia, Hawaii, Illinois, Kansas, Louisiana, Massachusetts, Minnesota, Nevada, New Hampshire, North Carolina, Oregon, Texas, Vermont and Washington have banned the use of tanning beds for minors under the age of 18. Other states strictly regulate indoor tanning under the age of 18, with most banning indoor tanning for persons under the age of 14 unless medically required, and some requiring the consent of a guardian for those aged 14–17. In 2010 under the Affordable Care Act, a 10% "tanning tax" was introduced, which is added to the fees charged by tanning facilities; it was expected to raise $2.7 billion for health care over ten years.

Tanning beds are regulated in the United States by the federal government's Code of Federal Regulations (21 CFR 1040.20). This is designed to ensure that the devices adhere to a set of safety rules, with the primary focus on sunbed and lamp manufacturers regarding maximum exposure times and product equivalence. Additionally, must have a "Recommended Exposure Schedule" posted on both the front of the tanning bed and in the owners' manual, and list the original lamp that was certified for that particular tanning bed. Salon owners are required to replace the lamps with either exactly the same lamp, or a lamp that is certified by the lamp manufacturer to be.

States control regulations for salons, regarding operator training, sanitization of sunbeds and eyewear, and additional warning signs. Many states also ban or regulate the use of tanning beds by minors under the age of 18.

American osteopathic physician Joseph Mercola was prosecuted in 2016 by the Federal Trade Commission (FTC) for selling tanning beds to "reverse your wrinkles" and "slash your risk of cancer". The settlement meant that consumers who had purchased the devices were eligible for refunds totalling $5.3 million. Mercola had falsely claimed that the FDA "endorsed indoor tanning devices as safe", and had failed to disclose that he had paid the Vitamin D Council for its endorsement of his devices. The FTC said that it was deceptive for the defendants to fail to disclose that tanning is not necessary to produce vitamin D.

See also
Indoor tanning lotion
Light skin in Japanese culture
Sunless tanning

Notes

References

Bibliography

Book chapters are cited in short form above and long form below. All other sources are cited above only.

Coups, Elliot J. and Phillips, L. Alison (2012). "Prevalence and Correlates of Indoor Tanning", in Carolyn J. Heckman, Sharon L. Manne (eds.), Shedding Light on Indoor Tanning. Dordrecht: Springer Science & Business Media, 5–32. 
Hay, Jennifer and Lipsky, Samara (2012), "International Perspectives on Indoor Tanning", in Heckman and Manne (eds)., 179–193.
Hunt, Yvonne; Augustson, Erik; Rutten, Lila; Moser, Richard; and Yaroch, Amy (2012). "History and Culture of Tanning in the United States", in Heckman and Manne (eds.), 33–68.
Lessin, Stuart R; Perlis, Clifford S.; Zook, and Matthew B. Zook (2012). "How Ultraviolet Radiation Tans Skin" in Heckman and Manne (eds.), 87–94.
Lluria-Prevatt, Maria; Dickinson, Sally E.; and Alberts, David S. (2013). "Skin Cancer Prevention", in David Alberts, Lisa M. Hess (eds.). Fundamentals of Cancer Prevention. Heidelberg and Berlin: Springer Verlag, 321–376. 

IARC Group 1 carcinogens
Skin pigmentation
Tanning (beauty treatment)
Ultraviolet radiation